The 1830 United States elections occurred in the middle of Democratic President Andrew Jackson's first term, during the Second Party System. Members of the 22nd United States Congress were chosen in this election. The election saw Jackson's Democrats retain control of both chambers of Congress over the National Republicans and other members of the anti-Jackson faction, while the Nullifier Party won seats in Congress for the first time.

In the House, both major parties lost seats to the Anti-Masonic Party, but Democrats retained a commanding majority.

In the Senate, both parties lost one seat to the Nullifiers, leaving the Democrats with half of the seats in the Senate. No party had a clear majority because Vice President John C. Calhoun aligned with the Nullifiers, and eventually resigned before the end of the 22nd Congress. However, Democrats retained control of the chamber, electing three different President pro tempores: Samuel Smith, Littleton W. Tazewell, and Hugh Lawson White.

See also
1830–31 United States House of Representatives elections
1830–31 United States Senate elections

References

1830 elections in the United States
1830
United States midterm elections